HNK Mitnica is a football club from Vukovar.

History
HNK Mitnica is founded March 2008, it was founded by  Croatian disabled homeland war veterans and Croatian war veterans from area of Vukovar's city district Mitnica.

Club is involved in 2. ŽNL Vukovarsko-srijemska since season 2014/15.

References

External links
Mitnica

Football clubs in Croatia
Football clubs in Vukovar-Srijem County
Sport in Vukovar
Association football clubs established in 2008
2008 establishments in Croatia